The Queen Elizabeth Theatre is a performing arts venue in downtown Vancouver, British Columbia, Canada. Along with the Orpheum, Vancouver Playhouse, and the Annex, it is one of four facilities operated by the Vancouver Civic Theatres on behalf of the city of Vancouver (the Playhouse adjoins the QE Theatre in the same complex). It was named after the former Canadian monarch, Queen Elizabeth II.

Formerly the home of the Vancouver Symphony Orchestra, which is now based at the Orpheum, the Queen Elizabeth Theatre is the home of the Vancouver Opera and Ballet BC, in addition to hosting various other musical events year-round. The theatre has a 70′ wide x 40′ deep (21.34m x 12.19m) stage / performing area. The building holds two venues: the 2,765 seat main auditorium and the 668 seat Playhouse Theatre.

The theatre was the first project by the Montreal-based architectural partnership Affleck, Desbarats, Dimakopoulos, Lebensold, Sise.  It opened in July 1959.

See also
Vancouver Playhouse Theatre Company

References

External links

Queen Elizabeth Theatre Website
Vancouver Opera's website
QET Renovations
Ballet BC website
Long range plan and renovations 1993-2011

Theatres in Vancouver
Opera houses in Canada
Music venues in Vancouver
Arcop buildings
Theatres completed in 1959
Music venues completed in 1959